Bayon is a German band founded around 1971 in the former GDR. Its musical style can be described as a mixture of folk, jazz, rock, and classical music. Internationally they came to prominence with their musical contribution Stell dich mitten in den Regen to the movie The Lives of Others. The name of the band derives from the Khmer temple Bayon in Cambodia.

History
Bayon arose around 1971 from the formation Garage Players, a former blues rock band. From the founder members only Christoph Theusner (GDR/Germany) is still present. Together with Sonny Thet they form the 'hard core' members of the band. In 1977 Bayon released their first LP record, which was self-titled. Beside their normal concert activities Bayon operated compositional for East German theaters in Berlin, Weimar and Gera as well as the East German media. So they made radio plays, film and stage scene music for well-known artists like Heiner Müller. The following albums Suite and El Sonido got a lot of attention in the GDR media.
In 2006 Bayon re-released their song Stell dich mitten in den Regen, which was first published on the Sampler Hallo No 1 by East German record label Amiga in 1972. In 2010, Bayon was awarded with the German World Music award RUTH for their lifework.

Trivia
Beside his work with Bayon Sonny Thet released three solo albums. Sonny Thet is the father of Anthony Thet the lead guitarist of the German rock band Asher Lane. In 2010 Anthony Thet became well known with his participation in the casting-show X Factor where he won through the finals. Christoph Theusner is the father of artist Ulrike Theusner.
Song 'Stell dich mitten in den Regen' was used in German film The Lives of Others.

Discography

LP record albums 
 1977: Bayon (Amiga)
 1980: Suite (Amiga)
 1986: El Sonido  (Amiga)
 1989: Echos - Klangbilder (Solo-LP by Christoph Theusner)

CDs 
 1992: Rock aus Deutschland OST – Vol.18 – Bayon
 1995: Walkin’ Home
 1996: Movens In Carmine - Herder
 1997: Die Suiten
 1997: Gespräch über den Dächern – W. Borchert
 2002: Live
 2005: Das Beste
 2008: Tanz der Apsara
 2014: Music for a while

Singles 
 1977: Lautensuite / Haus der Kindheit Amiga)

DVDs 
 2009: Zwischen(T)raumzeit - Eine Konzertdokumentation

References

External links 
 Official website (German)
 Myspace page

German world music groups
Musical groups established in 1971